Emmanuel Gonzalès (25 October 1815 – 17 October 1887) was a 19th-century French novelist, feuilletonist and playwright.

Gonzalès wrote the novel Frères de la côte, which impressed Émile Zola in his childhood, following the praise he made of its author on the occasion of the inauguration of a bust in his memory 25 October 1891. The ceremony was organized by the Société des gens de lettres, of which Gonzalès had been president from 1863. Zola knew him personally through Édouard Manet. Emmanuel Gonzales's daughter, Eva Gonzalès, entered Manet’s studio and became his only student, also serving as a model for his famous painting: Eva Gonzalès peignant dans l'atelier de Manet (1870).

Main works 
1838: Les Mémoires d'un ange
1841: Le Livre d'amour
1844: Les Frères de la côte
1849: Le Pêcheur de perles
1851: Le Vengeur du mari
1853: Le Chasseur d'hommes
1854: La Fille de l'aveugle
1856: Esau le lèpreux (Chroniques du temps de Duguesclin) 
1857: Les Chercheurs d'or
1857: La Princesse russe
1860: Mes jardins de Monaco
1862: La Maîtresse du proscrit
1863: L'hôtesse du Connétable
1865: Les Proscrits de Sicile
1876: Les Danseuses du Caucase.
1877:La Servante du diable
1866: Les Sabotiers de la Forêt Noire
1880: L'Épée de Suzanne
 1887: Rosario, (Short story in the collectif DENTU Pique-Nique)

19th-century French male writers
19th-century French novelists
19th-century French dramatists and playwrights
People from Saintes, Charente-Maritime
1815 births
1887 deaths
Burials at Montmartre Cemetery
French male novelists
French male dramatists and playwrights